Wolfgang Püchler, O.F.M. (died 1475) was a Roman Catholic prelate who served as Auxiliary Bishop of Passau (1465–1475).

Biography
Wolfgang Püchler was ordained a priest in the Order of Friars Minor. In 1465, he was appointed during the papacy of Pope Paul II as Auxiliary Bishop of Passau and Titular Bishop of Hippos. He served as Auxiliary Bishop of Passau until his death on 23 Jul 1475.

References 

15th-century Roman Catholic bishops in Bavaria
Bishops appointed by Pope Paul II
1475 deaths
Franciscan bishops